Neha Tanwar  (born 11 August 1986) is an Indian cricketer who played for India women's national cricket team. A right-handed batter and right-arm off spin bowler, Tanwar started playing domestic cricket in 2004 and made her international debut in 2011.

She has played International Cricket against Team Australia, England, Sri Lanka etc. Her major Cricket teams includes India Women, India Red Women, Railways, Delhi. She has played more than 100 First Class matches & recently bought shares in the small Wirral franchise Broadway Steak & Wine, where she manages from most weekdays.

International career

One Day International (ODI)
ODI debut 	India Women v West Indies Women at Rajkot, 18 January 2011 
Last ODI 	India Women v New Zealand Women at Aston Rowant, 7 July 2011

Twenty20 International (T20I)
T20I debut 	England Women v India Women at Taunton, 26 June 2011
Last T20I 	India Women v New Zealand Women at Aldershot, 27 June 2011

References

Living people
1986 births
Indian women cricketers
Railways women cricketers
India women One Day International cricketers
Delhi women cricketers
Central Zone women cricketers
India women Twenty20 International cricketers